Tigar is a 1978 drama film about retired boxing champion Sorga, nicknamed "Tigar". It is in the Serbo-Croatian language, and was made in Yugoslavia.

Broke, his wife leaves him for a wealthier guy. Šorga meets a juvenile thief, Čok, and decides to become his father figure. In the process of changing Čok, Šorga changes himself. The movie was written by Gordan Mihić, directed by Milan Jelić. Tigar is in Eastmancolor, mono sound mix, and runs 103 minutes.

Cast
Ljubiša Samardžić as Šorga 'Tigar'
Slavko Štimac as Čok
Milivoje Tomić
Snežana Nikšić as Tamara
Velimir 'Bata' Živojinović as Direktor
Pavle Vuisić as Šorgin trener
Rahela Ferari as Gospođa Hadžirakić
Radmila Savićević
Jelica Sretenović as Student pedagogije
Milan Bosiljčić
Ljubomir Ćipranić
Vera Čukić as Barbarela
Ivan Đurđević
Ljerka Draženović
Dragomir Felba
Bogdan Jakus
Dušan Janićijević as Trener
Vojislav Mićović
Predrag Milinković as Kelner
Nada Osmokrović
Bozidar Pavicević-Longa
Branko Petković
Olga Poznatov
Marinko Šebez
Rastko Tadić
Janez Vrhovec as Inspektor
Gizela Vuković
Vladan Živković

Crew
 Original Music by: Vojislav Kostic
 Cinematography by: Predrag Popovic
 Film Editing by: Ljiljana-Lana Vukobratovic
 Production Design by: Miodrag Hadzic 
 Costume Design: Mira Cohadzic
 Makeup: Radmila Ivatovic

See also
1978 in film

External links

1978 films
1978 drama films
Serbo-Croatian-language films
Serbian drama films
Yugoslav drama films
Films set in Yugoslavia
Films set in Belgrade
Films shot in Belgrade